The 2021  Vitality Blast was the 2021 season of the T20 Blast, a professional Twenty20 cricket league played in England and Wales. It was the fourth season in which the domestic T20 competition, run by the England and Wales Cricket Board (ECB), that was branded as the Vitality Blast due to the tournament's sponsorship deal. The Notts Outlaws were the defending champions.

In June 2021, Samit Patel, playing for the Notts Outlaws, became the first English player to do the double in T20 cricket of taking 250 wickets and scoring 5,000 runs.

In July 2021, Derbyshire's match against Essex in the 2021 County Championship was abandoned before the start of day two due to a positive COVID-19 case in the squad. As a result, Derbyshire's final two T20 Blast group-stage games, against the Northants Steelbacks and the Yorkshire Vikings, were also cancelled. Therefore, the North Group qualifications were decided based on an average points per completed match basis.

Following matches completed on 9 July 2021, the Notts Outlaws were the first team to qualify from the North Group for the quarter-finals. On the same day, they were joined by the Kent Spitfires from the South Group. After the matches completed on 16 July 2021, the Yorkshire Vikings from the North Group had qualified, along with Somerset from the South Group. On 17 July 2021, Lancashire Lightning won the Roses Match against the Yorkshire Vikings to qualify from the North Group. On the final day of group stage matches, the Birmingham Bears from the North Group, and the Sussex Sharks and the Hampshire Hawks from the South Group had all qualified for the quarter-finals.

In the first quarter-final match, the Sussex Sharks beat the Yorkshire Vikings to become the first team to reach Finals Day. The Hampshire Hawks reached the Finals Day, after they knocked out defending champions the Notts Outlaws in the second quarter-final match. Somerset became the third team to reach Finals Day, after they defeated the Lancashire Lightning in their quarter-final match. In the last quarter-final match, the Kent Spitfires beat the Birmingham Bears to progress to the Finals Day. It was the first time in the tournament's history that all the teams taking part in Finals Day had come from the South Group. 

On Finals Day, Somerset beat Hampshire Hawks by two wickets in the first semi-final to advance into the final. In the second semi-final, Kent Spitfires beat the Sussex Sharks by 21 runs to advance. It was the first time that Kent had reached the domestic T20 final since the 2008 tournament. In the final, the Kent Spitfires beat Somerset by 25 runs to win the tournament and their second domestic T20 title.

Format
Each county played seven matches at home, and seven matches away, with the top four counties in each group progressing to the Quarter-finals. The top two ranked counties from each group will host the Quarter-finals, to play against the lower-seeded team in other group.

Teams
The teams were placed into the following groups:

 North Group: Birmingham Bears, Derbyshire Falcons, Durham, Lancashire Lightning, Leicestershire Foxes, Northants Steelbacks, Notts Outlaws, Worcestershire Rapids, Yorkshire Vikings
 South Group: Essex Eagles, Glamorgan, Gloucestershire, Hampshire Hawks, Kent Spitfires, Middlesex, Somerset, Surrey, Sussex Sharks

North Group
Source:

South Group
Source:

North Group
Source:

June

July

South Group
Source:

June

July

Standings

North Group

 advances to Quarter-Finals

South Group

 advances to Quarter-Finals

Knock-out stage

Quarter-finals

Finals Day

Semi-finals

Final

Notes

References

External links
 Series home at ESPN Cricinfo

2021 in English cricket